A steel building is a metal structure fabricated with steel for the internal support and for exterior cladding, as opposed to steel framed buildings which generally use other materials for floors, walls, and external envelope.  Steel buildings are used for a variety of purposes including storage, work spaces and living accommodation.  They are classified into specific types depending on how they are used.

History

Steel buildings first gained popularity in the early 20th century.  Their use became more widespread during World War II and significantly expanded after the war when steel became more available. Steel buildings have been widely accepted, in part due to cost efficiency. The range of application has expanded with improved materials, products and design capabilities with the availability of computer aided design software.

Advantages
Steel provides several advantages over other building materials, such as concrete, wood:
Steel is structurally sound and manufactured to strict specifications and tolerances. 
Sustainability: Steel is a highly recyclable material, which means that steel buildings are environmentally friendly and can be easily recycled at the end of their useful life.
Faster Construction: Steel buildings can be erected much faster than traditional construction methods. This is because the components are pre-engineered and fabricated off-site, which means that construction can proceed much more quickly.
Energy Efficiency: Steel buildings can be designed with energy-efficient features, such as insulation, to reduce energy consumption and lower heating and cooling costs.
Steel does not easily warp, buckle, twist or bend, and is therefore easy to modify and offers design flexibility. Steel is also easy to install.
Steel is cost effective and rarely fluctuates in price.
Steel allows for improved quality of construction and less maintenance, while offering improved safety and resistance.
With the propagation of mold and mildew in residential building, using steel minimizes these infestations. Mold needs moist, porous material to grow. Steel studs do not have those problems.

Disadvantages
Although steel buildings have many advantages, there are also some disadvantages to consider:

 Cost: Steel buildings are often more expensive than traditional buildings made of wood or other materials.

 Corrosion: Steel is vulnerable to rust and corrosion, especially in areas with high humidity or salt content in the air. This can weaken the structural integrity of the building and require costly repairs.

 Thermal Conductivity: Steel is an excellent conductor of heat and cold, which means that it may require more insulation and HVAC systems to maintain a comfortable temperature inside.

 Expansion and Contraction: Steel can expand and contract with temperature changes, which can cause stress on the building's connections and joints, leading to structural issues.

 Noise: Steel buildings can be noisier than other types of buildings due to the metal roof and walls. This may not be ideal for certain applications, such as residential or office buildings.

 Aesthetics: Some people may not like the look of steel buildings or find them less attractive than traditional buildings made of other materials.

 Permits: Depending on the location and zoning regulations, obtaining permits for a steel building can be more difficult and time-consuming than for other types of buildings.

Types
Some common types of steel buildings are "straight-walled" and "arch," or Nissen or Quonset hut. Further, the structural type may be classed as clear span or multiple span. A clear span building does not have structural supports (e.g. columns) in the interior occupied space.

Straight-walled and arch type refer to the outside shape of the building. More generally, these are both structural arch forms if they rely on a rigid frame structure. However, curved roof structures are typically associated with the arch term.

Steel arch buildings may be cost efficient for specific applications.  They are commonly used in the agricultural industry.  Straight-walled buildings provide more usable space when compared to arch buildings.  They are also easier to blend into existing architecture.  Straight-walled buildings are commonly used for commercial, industrial, and many other occupancy types. 

Clear span refers to the internal construction.  Clear span steel buildings utilize large overhead support beams, thus reducing the need for internal supporting columns.  Clear span steel buildings tend to be less cost efficient than structures with interior columns. However, other practical considerations may influence the selection of framing style such as an occupancy where interior structural obstructions are undesirable (e.g. aircraft hangars or sport arenas).

Long Bay buildings are designed for use in bay spans of over 35'.  They use prefabricated metal frames combined with conventional joists to provide larger openings and clearances in buildings.

Components
Building portions that are shop assembled prior to shipment to site are commonly referenced as prefabricated. The smaller steel buildings tend to be prefabricated or simple enough to be constructed by anyone. Prefabrication offers the benefits of being less costly than traditional methods and is more environmentally friendly (since no waste is produced on-site). The larger steel buildings require skilled construction workers, such as ironworkers, to ensure proper and safe assembly.

There are five main types of structural components that make up a steel frame - tension members, compression members, bending members, combined force members and their connections. Tension members are usually found as web and chord members in trusses and open web steel joists. Ideally tension members carry tensile forces, or pulling forces, only and its end connections are assumed to be pinned. Pin connections prevent any moment(rotation) or shear forces from being applied to the member. 
Compression members are also considered as columns, struts, or posts. They are vertical members or web and chord members in trusses and joists that are in compression or being squished. 
Bending members are also known as beams, girders, joists, spandrels, purlins, lintels, and girts. Each of these members have their own structural application, but typically bending members will carry bending moments and shear forces as primary loads and axial forces and torsion as secondary loads. 
Combined force members are commonly known as beam-columns and are subjected to bending and axial compression.
Connections are what bring the entire building together. They join these members together and must ensure that  they function together as one unit.

See also

Commercial modular construction
History of the steel industry (1970–present)
Metal Building Manufacturers Association
Sheet metal
Steel producers
Structural steel
Self-framing metal buildings

External links
IAS AC472 faqs

References 

Construction
Buildings and structures by construction material
 Steel